Jan Schindler (born 4 September 1978) is a Czech rower. He competed at the 2004 Summer Olympics in Athens with the men's coxless four where they came eighths.

References

1978 births
Living people
Czech male rowers
Olympic rowers of the Czech Republic
Rowers at the 2004 Summer Olympics
People from Cheb
European Rowing Championships medalists
Sportspeople from the Karlovy Vary Region